Below are the results of the 2019 World Series of Poker, held from May 29-July 16 at the Rio All-Suite Hotel and Casino in Las Vegas, Nevada.

Key

Results

2019 WSOP Event #1: $500 Casino Employees No Limit Hold'em

 3-Day Event: May 29-31
 Number of Entries: 686
 Total Prize Pool: $298,410
 Number of Payouts: 103
 Winning Hand:

Event #2: $10,000 Super Turbo Bounty

 2-Day Event: May 29-30
 Number of Entries: 204
 Total Prize Pool: $1,917,600
 Number of Payouts: 31
 Winning Hand:

Event #3: $500 Big 50 No Limit Hold'em

 9-Day Event: May 30-June 7
 Number of Entries: 28,371
 Total Prize Pool: $13,509,435
 Number of Payouts: 4,258
 Winning Hand: 
 Note: Set a new record for largest live poker tournament

Event #4: $1,500 Omaha Hi/Lo 8 or Better

 4-Day Event: May 30-June 2
 Number of Entries: 853
 Total Prize Pool: $1,151,550
 Number of Payouts: 128
 Winning Hand:

Event #5: $50,000 No Limit Hold'em High Roller

 4-Day Event: May 31-June 3
 Number of Entries: 110
 Total Prize Pool: $5,280,000
 Number of Payouts: 17
 Winning Hand:

Event #6: $2,500 Limit Mixed Triple Draw

 3-Day Event: June 1-3
 Number of Entries: 296
 Total Prize Pool: $666,000
 Number of Payouts: 45
 Winning Hand:

Event #7: $400 WSOP.com Online No Limit Hold'em

 1-Day Event: June 2
 Number of Entries: 2,825
 Total Prize Pool: $1,017,002
 Number of Payouts: 333
 Winning Hand:

Event #8: $10,000 Short Deck No Limit Hold'em

 3-Day Event: June 2-4
 Number of Entries: 114
 Total Prize Pool: $1,071,600
 Number of Payouts: 18
 Winning Hand:

Event #9: $600 No Limit Hold'em Deepstack

 2-Day Event: June 3-4
 Number of Entries: 6,151
 Total Prize Pool: $3,229,275
 Number of Payouts: 923
 Winning Hand:

Event #10: $1,500 Dealers Choice

 3-Day Event: June 3-5
 Number of Entries: 470
 Total Prize Pool: $634,500
 Number of Payouts: 71
 Winning Hand:  (No Limit Hold'em)

Event #11: $5,000 No Limit Hold'em

 4-Day Event: June 3-6
 Number of Entries: 400
 Total Prize Pool: $1,860,000
 Number of Payouts: 60
 Winning Hand:

Event #12: $1,000 No Limit Hold'em Super Turbo Bounty

 1-Day Event: June 4
 Number of Entries: 2,452
 Total Prize Pool: $22,068,000
 Number of Payouts: 368
 Winning Hand:

Event #13: $1,500 No Limit 2-7 Lowball Draw

 3-Day Event: June 4-6
 Number of Entries: 296
 Total Prize Pool: $399,600
 Number of Payouts: 44
 Winning Hand:

Event #14: $1,500 H.O.R.S.E.

 4-Day Event: June 5-8
 Number of Entries: 751
 Total Prize Pool: $1,013,850
 Number of Payouts: 113
 Winning Hand:  (Omaha Hi-Lo)

Event #15: $10,000 Heads Up No Limit Hold'em

 4-Day Event: June 5-8
 Number of Entries: 112
 Total Prize Pool: $1,052,800
 Number of Payouts: 8
 Winning Hand:

Event #16: $1,500 No Limit Hold'em 6-Handed

 4-Day Event: June 5-8
 Number of Entries: 1,832
 Total Prize Pool: $2,473,200
 Number of Payouts: 275
 Winning Hand:

Event #17: $1,500 No Limit Hold'em Shootout

 3-Day Event: June 6-8
 Number of Entries: 917
 Total Prize Pool: $1,237,950
 Number of Payouts: 100
 Winning Hand:

Event #18: $10,000 Omaha Hi-Lo 8 or Better

 4-Day Event: June 6-9
 Number of Entries: 183
 Total Prize Pool: $1,720,200
 Number of Payouts: 28
 Winning Hand:

Event #19: $1,500 Millionaire Maker No Limit Hold'em

 5-Day Event: June 7-12
 Number of Entries: 8,809
 Total Prize Pool: $11,892,150
 Number of Payouts: 1,322
 Winning Hand:

Event #20: $1,500 Seven Card Stud

 4-Day Event: June 7-10
 Number of Entries: 285
 Total Prize Pool: $384,750
 Number of Payouts: 43
 Winning Hand:

Event #21: $10,000 No Limit 2-7 Lowball Draw

 4-Day Event: June 8-11
 Number of Entries: 91
 Total Prize Pool: $855,400
 Number of Payouts: 14
 Winning Hand: 
 Note: Bechtel's first bracelet in 26 years, the longest span between wins in WSOP history

Event #22: $1,000 Double Stack No Limit Hold'em

 2-Day Event: June 9-10
 Number of Entries: 3,253
 Total Prize Pool: $2,927,700
 Number of Payouts: 488
 Winning Hand:

Event #23: $1,500 Eight Game Mix

 4-Day Event: June 9-12
 Number of Entries: 612
 Total Prize Pool: $826,200
 Number of Payouts: 92
 Winning Hand:  (Limit Hold'em)

Event #24: $600 WSOP.com Online Pot Limit Omaha 6-Handed

 1-Day Event: June 9
 Number of Entries: 1,216
 Total Prize Pool: $656,640
 Number of Payouts: 99
 Winning Hand:

Event #25: $600 Pot Limit Omaha Deepstack

 3-Day Event: June 10-12
 Number of Entries: 2,577
 Total Prize Pool: $1,352,925
 Number of Payouts: 387
 Winning Hand:

Event #26: $2,620 No Limit Hold'em Marathon

 6-Day Event: June 10-15
 Number of Entries: 1,083
 Total Prize Pool: $2,553,714
 Number of Payouts: 163
 Winning Hand:

Event #27: $1,500 Seven Card Stud Hi/Lo 8 or Better

 4-Day Event: June 10-13
 Number of Entries: 460
 Total Prize Pool: $621,000
 Number of Payouts: 69
 Winning Hand:

Event #28: $1,000 No Limit Hold'em

 3-Day Event: June 11-13
 Number of Entries: 2,477
 Total Prize Pool: $2,229,300
 Number of Payouts: 372
 Winning Hand:

Event #29: $10,000 H.O.R.S.E.

 4-Day Event: June 11-14
 Number of Entries: 172
 Total Prize Pool: $1,616,800
 Number of Payouts: 26
 Winning Hand:  (Stud Hi-Lo)

Event #30: $1,000 Pot Limit Omaha

 4-Day Event: June 12-15
 Number of Entries: 1,526
 Total Prize Pool: $1,374,300
 Number of Payouts: 229
 Winning Hand:

Event #31: $3,000 No Limit Hold'em 6-Handed

 3-Day Event: June 12-14
 Number of Entries: 754
 Total Prize Pool: $2,035,800
 Number of Payouts: 114
 Winning Hand:

Event #32: $1,000 Seniors No Limit Hold'em

 4-Day Event: June 13-16
 Number of Entries: 5,917
 Total Prize Pool: $5,325,300
 Number of Payouts: 888
 Winning Hand:

Event #33: $1,500 Limit 2-7 Lowball Triple Draw

 3-Day Event: June 13-15
 Number of Entries: 467
 Total Prize Pool: $630,450
 Number of Payouts: 71
 Winning Hand:

Event #34: $1,000 Double Stack No Limit Hold'em

 6-Day Event: June 14-19
 Number of Entries: 6,214
 Total Prize Pool: $5,592,600
 Number of Payouts: 933
 Winning Hand:

Event #35: $10,000 Dealers Choice 6-Handed

 4-Day Event: June 14-17
 Number of Entries: 122
 Total Prize Pool: $1,146,800
 Number of Payouts: 19
 Winning Hand:  (No Limit Hold'em)
 Note: Friedman won the event for the second straight year

Event #36: $3,000 No Limit Hold'em Shootout

 3-Day Event: June 15-17
 Number of Entries: 313
 Total Prize Pool: $845,100
 Number of Payouts: 40
 Winning Hand:

Event #37: $800 No Limit Hold'em Deepstack

 3-Day Event: June 16-18
 Number of Entries: 2,808
 Total Prize Pool: $1,999,296
 Number of Payouts: 422
 Winning Hand:

Event #38: $600 WSOP.com Online No Limit Hold'em Knockout Bounty

 1-Day Event: June 16
 Number of Entries: 1,224
 Total Prize Pool: $673,200
 Number of Payouts: 207
 Winning Hand: 10-10

Event #39: $1,000 Super Seniors No Limit Hold'em

 4-Day Event: June 17-20
 Number of Entries: 2,650
 Total Prize Pool: $2,385,000
 Number of Payouts: 398
 Winning Hand:

Event #40: $1,500 Pot Limit Omaha

 3-Day Event: June 17-19
 Number of Entries: 1,216
 Total Prize Pool: $1,641,600
 Number of Payouts: 183
 Winning Hand:

Event #41: $10,000 Seven Card Stud

 4-Day Event: June 17-20
 Number of Entries: 88
 Total Prize Pool: $827,200
 Number of Payouts: 14
 Winning Hand:

Event #42: $600 Mixed No Limit Hold'em/Pot Limit Omaha Deepstack 8-Handed

 2-Day Event: June 18-19
 Number of Entries: 2,403
 Total Prize Pool: $1,261,575
 Number of Payouts: 361
 Winning Hand:

Event #43: $2,500 Mixed Big Bet

 3-Day Event: June 18-20
 Number of Entries: 218
 Total Prize Pool: $490,500
 Number of Payouts: 33
 Winning Hand: 
 Note: Klein became the third player, and first since 1979, to win bracelets in four straight years

Event #44: $1,500 No Limit Hold'em Bounty

 3-Day Event: June 19-21
 Number of Entries: 1,807
 Total Prize Pool: $2,439,450
 Number of Payouts: 272
 Winning Hand:

Event #45: $25,000 Pot Limit Omaha High Roller

 4-Day Event: June 19-22
 Number of Entries: 278
 Total Prize Pool: $6,602,500
 Number of Payouts: 42
 Winning Hand:

Event #46: $500 WSOP.com Online No Limit Hold'em Turbo Deepstack

 1-Day Event: June 19
 Number of Entries: 1,767
 Total Prize Pool: $795,180
 Number of Payouts: 180
 Winning Hand:

Event #47: $1,000/$10,000 Ladies No Limit Hold'em

 4-Day Event: June 20-23
 Number of Entries: 968
 Total Prize Pool: $871,200
 Number of Payouts: 146
 Winning Hand:

Event #48: $2,500 No Limit Hold'em

 3-Day Event: June 20-22
 Number of Entries: 996
 Total Prize Pool: $2,241,000
 Number of Payouts: 150
 Winning Hand:

Event #49: $10,000 Limit 2-7 Lowball Triple Draw

 3-Day Event: June 20-22
 Number of Entries: 100
 Total Prize Pool: $940,000
 Number of Payouts: 15
 Winning Hand:

Event #50: $1,500 Monster Stack No Limit Hold'em

 6-Day Event: June 21-26
 Number of Entries: 6,035
 Total Prize Pool: $8,147,250
 Number of Payouts: 906
 Winning Hand:

Event #51: $2,500 Mixed Omaha/Seven Card Stud Hi/Lo 8 or Better

 3-Day Event: June 21-23
 Number of Entries: 401
 Total Prize Pool: $902,250
 Number of Payouts: 61
 Winning Hand:

Event #52: $10,000 Pot Limit Omaha 8-Handed

 4-Day Event: June 22-25
 Number of Entries: 518
 Total Prize Pool: $4,869,200
 Number of Payouts: 78
 Winning Hand:

Event #53: $800 No Limit Hold'em Deepstack 8-Handed

 3-Day Event: June 23-25
 Number of Entries: 3,759
 Total Prize Pool: $2,676,408
 Number of Payouts: 564
 Winning Hand:

Event #54: $1,500 Razz

 4-Day Event: June 23-26
 Number of Entries: 363
 Total Prize Pool: $490,050
 Number of Payouts: 55
 Winning Hand:

Event #55: $1,000 WSOP.com Online No Limit Hold'em Double Stack

 1-Day Event: June 23
 Number of Entries: 1,333
 Total Prize Pool: $1,266,350
 Number of Payouts: 153
 Winning Hand:

Event #56: $1,500 No Limit Hold'em Super Turbo Bounty

 1-Day Event: June 24
 Number of Entries: 1,867
 Total Prize Pool: $2,520,450
 Number of Payouts: 281
 Winning Hand:

Event #57: $1,000 Tag Team No Limit Hold'em

 4-Day Event: June 24-27
 Number of Entries: 976
 Total Prize Pool: $878,400
 Number of Payouts: 147
 Winning Hand:

Event #58: $50,000 Poker Players Championship

 5-Day Event: June 24-28
 Number of Entries: 74
 Total Prize Pool: $3,552,000
 Number of Payouts: 12
 Winning Hand:  (2-7 Triple Draw)

Event #59: $600 No Limit Hold'em Deepstack Championship

 4-Day Event: June 25-28
 Number of Entries: 6,140
 Total Prize Pool: $3,223,500
 Number of Payouts: 921
 Winning Hand:

Event #60: $1,500 Pot Limit Omaha Hi/Lo 8 or Better

 4-Day Event: June 25-28
 Number of Entries: 1,117
 Total Prize Pool: $1,507,950
 Number of Payouts: 168
 Winning Hand:

Event #61: $400 Colossus No Limit Hold'em

 4-Day Event: June 26-29
 Number of Entries: 13,109
 Total Prize Pool: $4,382,515
 Number of Payouts: 1,952
 Winning Hand:

Event #62: $10,000 Razz

 4-Day Event: June 26-29 
 Number of Entries: 116
 Total Prize Pool: $1,090,400
 Number of Payouts: 18
 Winning Hand:

Event #63: $1,500 Omaha Mix

 4-Day Event: June 27-30
 Number of Entries: 717 
 Total Prize Pool: $967,950
 Number of Payouts: 108
 Winning Hand:

Event #64: $888 Crazy Eights No Limit Hold'em

 6-Day Event: June 28-July 3
 Number of Entries: 10,185
 Total Prize Pool: $7,720,210
 Number of Payouts: 1,496
 Winning Hand:

Event #65: $10,000 Pot Limit Omaha Hi-Lo 8 or Better

 4-Day Event: June 28-July 1
 Number of Entries: 193
 Total Prize Pool: $1,814,200
 Number of Payouts: 29
 Winning Hand:

Event #66: $1,500 Limit Hold'em

 3-Day Event: June 29-July 1
 Number of Entries: 541
 Total Prize Pool: $730,350
 Number of Payouts: 82
 Winning Hand:

Event #67: $10,000 Seven Card Stud Hi-Lo 8 or Better

 3-Day Event: June 30-July 2
 Number of Entries: 151 
 Total Prize Pool: $1,419,400
 Number of Payouts: 23
 Winning Hand:

Event #68: $1,000 WSOP.com Online No Limit Hold'em Championship

 1-Day Event: June 30
 Number of Entries: 1,750
 Total Prize Pool: $1,662,500
 Number of Payouts: 180
 Winning Hand:

Event #69: $1,000 Mini Main Event No Limit Hold'em

 3-Day Event: July 1-3
 Number of Entries: 5,521
 Total Prize Pool: $4,968,900
 Number of Payouts: 829
 Winning Hand:

Event #70: $5,000 No Limit Hold'em 6-Handed

 4-Day Event: July 1-4
 Number of Entries: 815 
 Total Prize Pool: $3,789,750
 Number of Payouts: 123
 Winning Hand:

Event #71: $500 Salute to Warriors No Limit Hold'em

 3-Day Event: July 2-5
 Number of Entries: 1,723
 Total Prize Pool: $723,660
 Number of Payouts: 259
 Winning Hand:

Event #72: $10,000 Limit Hold'em Championship

 3-Day Event: July 2-4
 Number of Entries: 118
 Total Prize Pool: $1,109,200
 Number of Payouts: 18
 Winning Hand:

Event #73: $10,000 No Limit Hold'em Main Event

 13-Day Event: July 3-16 
 Number of Entries: 8,569
 Total Prize Pool: $80,548,600
 Number of Payouts: 1,286
 Winning Hand:

Event #74: $3,200 WSOP.com Online No Limit Hold'em High Roller

 1-Day Event: July 3
 Number of Entries: 593
 Total Prize Pool: $1,802,720
 Number of Payouts: 72
 Winning Hand:

Event #75: $1,000 + $111 Little One for One Drop No Limit Hold'em

 7-Day Event: July 6-12
 Number of Entries: 6,248
 Total Prize Pool: $5,623,200
 Number of Payouts: 937
 Winning Hand:

Event #76: $800 WSOP.com Online No Limit Hold'em 6-Handed

 1-Day Event: July 7
 Number of Entries: 1,560
 Total Prize Pool: $1,170,000
 Number of Payouts: 153
 Winning Hand:

Event #77: $3,000 Limit Hold'em 6-Handed

 4-Day Event: July 8-11
 Number of Entries: 193
 Total Prize Pool: $521,100
 Number of Payouts: 29
 Winning Hand:

Event #90: $50,000 Final Fifty High Roller No Limit Hold'em

 3-Day Event: July 8-10
 Number of Entries: 123
 Total Prize Pool: $5,904,000
 Number of Payouts: 19
 Winning Hand: 
 Note: This was a late addition to the WSOP schedule

Event #78: $1,500 Pot Limit Omaha Bounty

 4-Day Event: July 9-12
 Number of Entries: 1,130
 Total Prize Pool: $1,525,500
 Number of Payouts: 170
 Winning Hand:

Event #79: $3,000 No Limit Hold'em

 4-Day Event: July 9-12
 Number of Entries: 671
 Total Prize Pool: $1,811,700
 Number of Payouts: 101
 Winning Hand:

Event #80: $1,500 Mixed No Limit Hold'em/Pot Limit Omaha

 4-Day Event: July 10-13
 Number of Entries: 1,250 
 Total Prize Pool: $1,687,500
 Number of Payouts: 188
 Winning Hand:

Event #81: $1,500 50th Annual Bracelet Winners Only No Limit Hold'em

 3-Day Event: July 10-12
 Number of Entries: 185
 Total Prize Pool: $277,500
 Number of Payouts: 28
 Winning Hand:

Event #82: $1,500 No Limit Hold'em Double Stack

 3-Day Event: July 11-14
 Number of Entries: 2,589
 Total Prize Pool: $3,495,150
 Number of Payouts: 389
 Winning Hand:

Event #83: $100,000 No Limit Hold'em High Roller

 3-Day Event: July 11-13
 Number of Entries: 99
 Total Prize Pool: $9,603,000
 Number of Payouts: 15
 Winning Hand:

Event #84: $1,500 The Closer No Limit Hold'em

 4-Day Event: July 12-15
 Number of Entries: 2,800
 Total Prize Pool: $3,780,000
 Number of Payouts: 393
 Winning Hand:

Event #85: $3,000 Pot Limit Omaha 6-Handed

 4-Day Event: July 12-15
 Number of Entries: 835
 Total Prize Pool: $2,254,500
 Number of Payouts: 126
 Winning Hand:

Event #86: $10,000 No Limit Hold'em 6-Handed

 4-Day Event: July 13-16
 Number of Entries: 272
 Total Prize Pool: $2,556,800
 Number of Payouts: 41
 Winning Hand:

Event #87: $3,000 H.O.R.S.E.

 3-Day Event: July 14-16
 Number of Entries: 301
 Total Prize Pool: $812,700
 Number of Payouts: 46
 Winning Hand:  (Hold'em)

Event #88: $500 WSOP.com Online No Limit Hold'em Summer Saver

 1-Day Event: July 14
 Number of Entries: 1,859
 Total Prize Pool: $836,550
 Number of Payouts: 207
 Winning Hand:

Event #89: $5,000 No Limit Hold'em

 2-Day Event: July 15-16
 Number of Entries: 608
 Total Prize Pool: $2,827,200
 Number of Payouts: 92
 Winning Hand:

External links
Official website

References

World Series of Poker
World Series of Poker Results, 2019